The Singapore Football League (SFL) is a semi-professional football tournament for clubs that are affiliated to the Football Association of Singapore. It makes up the second and third tier of football in Singapore after the professional Singapore Premier League, which was established in 1996 and before the FAS Island Wide League. The teams are also eligible to compete in the Singapore FA Cup.

Although it is semi-professional competition organized by the FAS, several former Singapore internationals and ex-S.League players have played in the NFL such as Jonathan Xu, Indra Sahdan (Eunos Crescent), Yazid Yasin (Gymkhana FC) and Zulkiffli Hassim (Yishun Sentek Mariners).

History
The history of NFL can be traced back to the earliest 20th century during the British colonization of Singapore, whereby the Singapore Amateur Football Association (SAFA), now known as Football Association of Singapore was formed in year of 1892. The then SAFA was responsible for organising the top tier football leagues in Singapore. The NFL was a top tier football league from early 20th century, until the formation of FAS Premier League in 1988. It was previously made up of Division 1, Division 2 and Division 3, with the bottom team of Division 3 being relegated to the FAS Island Wide League.

As of 2018, it makes up provisional tiers 2 and 3, behind the professional Singapore Premier League, with rules of promotion and relegation applied for teams in NFL Division One and NFL Division Two. Teams play two-round league home-away format. League features promotions and relegations for all the teams in both divisions, where the top two teams of a division will be promoted to the upper division, and the last two relegated to the lower division.

Division 1 clubs
 Balestier United RC
 Siglap FC
 Eunos Crescent FC
 Katong FC
 Police Sports Association
 SAFSA
 Singapore Khalsa Association
 Tiong Bahru FC
 Yishun Sentek Mariners FC
 Warwick Knights FC

Division 2 clubs
 Admiralty CSC
 Admiralty FC
 Bishan Barx FC
 Jungfrau Punggol
 Kaki Bukit
 Kembangan United
 Project Vaults Oxley SC
 Singapore Cricket Club
 South Avenue SC

Past champions 
In 1975, the Football Association of Singapore revamped the existing league structure involving 118 teams into a two-tier league system. 
For the 1987 season, the teams play each other once in a league format. The top eight placed teams in the league progressed to a knock-out stage to determine the champions. League stage winners Tiong Bahru defeated 4th-placed Tampines Rovers 2–1 in the final to clinch the championship. Reference:
The top tier of the football league system was replaced by the FAS Premier League from 1988, the S.League from 1996 and the Singapore Premier League from 2018.

NFL Division 1

NFL Division 2

NFL Division 3

Island Wide League

See also
 FAS Premier League
 Singapore Premier League
 Singapore FA Cup
 Singapore League Cup
 Prime League
 List of football clubs in Singapore
 List of Singapore's football leagues winners
 Singapore football league system

References

 
2
Second level football leagues in Asia
Professional sports leagues in Singapore